Van Andel Institute (VAI) is a 501(c)(3) nonprofit biomedical research and science education organization in Grand Rapids, Michigan. VAI was founded by Jay and Betty Van Andel in 1996.

The institute's research focuses on cancer epigenetics and Parkinson's disease. Its educational efforts support teacher development and science education from early elementary through the doctoral level.

David Van Andel, son of Jay and Betty, has served as CEO and chairman of the board since 1996.

Research
Van Andel Research Institute (VARI) scientists study the epigenetic, genetic, cellular and structural basis of cancer and Parkinson's disease as well as osteoarthritis, neurofibromatosis type 1, Alzheimer's disease, prion diseases, Ewing sarcoma and other conditions.

As of 2023, Van Andel Institute has more than 500 employees.

Center for Epigenetics 
The Center for Epigenetics was established in 2014 and is led by Peter Jones. Scientists in the Center focus on identifying epigenetic mechanisms in health and disease states, and translating their findings into new treatments for cancer and neurodegenerative diseases.

Center for Neurodegenerative Science 
The Center for Neurodegenerative Science was established in 2012.  The center primarily investigates the underlying causes of Parkinson's disease.

Center for Cancer and Cell Biology 
The Center for Cancer and Cell Biology is led by Bart Williams. It is the largest center at the institute.

Core Technologies and Services 
The institute's laboratories are supported by a Core Technologies and Services group that comprises eight shared scientific services:
 Bioinformatics and biostatistics
 Confocal microscopy and quantitative imaging
 Cryo-electron microscopy
 Flow cytometry
 Genomics
 Optical Imaging
 Pathology and biorepository
 Transgenics and vivarium 
In 2017, the institute established the David Van Andel Advanced Cryo-Electron Microscopy Suite as part of an expansion of its structural biology program. The $10 million investment included the installation of an FEI Titan Krios cryo-electron microscope, a Talos Arctica cryo-electron microscope and a Tecnai Spirit G2 BioTWIN screening microscope.

The institute also houses a College of American Pathologists-accredited Biorepository that contains more than one million formalin-fixed paraffin-embedded blocks.

Large-Scale Collaborations 
Grand River Aseptic Manufacturing (GRAM) was founded in 2010 by Van Andel Institute and Grand Valley State University. Much of GRAM's initial funding was through angel investment that generated $5 million in 2010 and another $2 million in 2013.

In September 2014, the institute partnered with The Cure Parkinson's Trust on its Linked Clinical Trials initiative, which investigates repurposed drugs for use as disease-modifying treatments for Parkinson's. LCT has supported trials in ambroxol, exenatide, simvastatin, liraglutide, and others.

In October, the institute announced a partnership with Stand Up To Cancer to form the VARI–SU2C Epigenetics Dream Team, a multi-institutional collaboration to translate potential epigenetic treatments for cancer into clinical trials. The team is led by Jones and Stephen Baylin, M.D co-head of the Cancer Biology Program at Johns Hopkins University's Sidney Kimmel Comprehensive Cancer Center. It has launched six clinical trials in cancers, including metastatic colorectal cancer, myelodysplastic syndrome, acute myeloid leukemia, non-small cell lung cancer, and bladder cancer.

Research Leadership 
In 1999, George Vande Woude, joined VARI as its founding research director. He previously served as director of the Basic Research Program at the Frederick Cancer Research and Development Center as well as the director for the Division of Basic Sciences at the National Cancer Institute. In the early 1980s, Vande Woude's laboratory discovered the human MET oncogene, which is now an important target in the development of anti-cancer drugs. He stepped down from his post as research director in 2009 to devote more time to his research. He was a Distinguished Scientific Fellow at VARI and was a fellow of the National Academy of Sciences and the American Association for the Advancement of Science.

Vande Woude was succeeded by Jeffrey Trent, who served a dual role as research director at VARI and at Translational Genomics Research Institute (TGen) in Phoenix, Arizona. Trent founded TGen in 2002 after 10 years at the National Human Genome Research Institute, a part of the National Institutes of Health. He left VARI in 2012 to lead TGen full-time.

In 2013, Peter Jones, was named as the institute's chief scientific officer after 37 years at the University of Southern California, where he most recently served as director of USC's Norris Comprehensive Cancer Center from 1993 to 2011. Jones's work helped established the field of epigenetics, particularly his seminal 1980 discovery that DNA methylation impacts gene expression and cellular differentiation. He is past president of the American Association for Cancer Research and is an elected fellow of the National Academy of Sciences, the American Academy of Arts and Sciences, the American Association for the Advancement of Science and the American Association for Cancer Research Academy. Jones also serves as director of the institute's Center for Epigenetics.

Education
Van Andel Education Institute (VAEI), founded in 1996, provides kindergarten to 12th-grade inquiry-based science education programs for students, and sustained professional development programs and instructional tools for educators.

Leadership 
Gordon Van Wylen was appointed director of VAEI in 1996. Before serving as director of VAEI, Van Wylen was elected dean of the Engineering Department at the University of Michigan in 1965 and later served as president of Hope College in Holland, Michigan, from 1972 to 1987.

Gordon Van Harn was appointed director of VAEI in 2001 and served in this capacity until 2009. Van Harn was also an Emeritus Provost and Professor of Biology at Calvin College in Grand Rapids, Michigan.

Marcia Bishop was appointed associate director of VAEI in 2004. She served in this role until 2011 when Jim Nicolette was appointed to the position of associate director.

Steven J. Triezenberg served as director of VAEI between 2009 and 2015. Triezenberg previously served as a faculty member of the Department of Biochemistry and Molecular Biology at Michigan State University for more than 18 years.

Terra Tarango was appointed director of VAEI in 2016. Tarango previously held the position of president of Staff Development for Educators (SDE), a professional development company in New Hampshire, from 2012 to 2016. Tarango also designed print and digital curriculum for kindergarten through 12th-grade students at Houghton Mifflin Harcourt.

Student programs 
VAEI's student programs for kindergarten through 12th grade students include:
 Summer Camps 
 Field Experience 
 High School Journal Club 
 Out of-School Time Cohort
 Science on Saturday

Teacher professional development 
VAEI designs and provides professional development workshops and instructional tools for kindergarten through twelfth grade teachers. Materials include downloadable lesson plans, interactive student journals, and classroom resources.

Science education tools 
In 2015, VAEI launched NexGen Inquiry, a web-based instructional tool designed to help students and teachers meet Next Generation Science Standards (NGSS) as well as other state benchmarks, and provides teachers with the tools they need to incorporate inquiry-based learning in their classrooms.

Van Andel Institute Graduate School 
Van Andel Institute Graduate School (VAIGS) offers an accredited program in cell and molecular genetics that is designed to foster problem-based thinking and research leadership. VAIGS also offers an M.D./Ph.D. program in partnership with Michigan State University College of Human Medicine and Western Michigan University Homer Stryker M.D. Medical School.

VAIGS was founded in 2005 under the leadership of then-VAEI director Gordon Van Harn, . The first graduating class was in 2012. VAIGS was accredited by the HLC on November 12, 2013. Steven J. Triezenberg, was named the founding dean in 2006.

Purple Community 
Purple Community, founded in 2009, is Van Andel Institute's grassroots community awareness and fundraising program. Purple Community helps individuals and organizations create fundraising events to support biomedical research and science education at Van Andel Institute.

Architecture
Van Andel Institute is located on the Grand Rapids Medical Mile. Its 400,000 square foot building was designed by architect Rafael Viñoly and was constructed in two phases; the first phase was completed in 2000 and second phase opened in December 2009. It includes 27,500 square feet of laboratory space, 71,000 square feet of laboratory support space, a demonstration lab, an auditorium and on-site cafeteria. The institute's Phase II was awarded Leadership in Energy & Environmental Design (LEED) Platinum status by the United States Green Building Council in 2011.

The lobby features a 14-foot tall glass sculpture called "Life" created by Dale Chihuly designed to be an artistic representation of a DNA double helix.

References

Cancer organizations based in the United States
Medical research institutes in the United States
Genetics or genomics research institutions
Medical and health organizations based in Michigan
Organizations established in 1996
Independent research institutes
Research institutes in Michigan